The Chaco nothura (Nothura maculosa chacoensis) is a type of tinamou commonly found in brushland in Argentina and Paraguay.

Description
It is similar to the spotted nothura, but paler and buffier overall.

Range and habitat
This species is native to the chaco of northwestern Paraguay and north central Argentina in South America.

Taxonomy
The Chaco nothura is a subspecies of spotted nothura, Nothura maculosa.

All tinamou are from the family Tinamidae, and in the larger scheme are also ratites. Unlike other ratites, tinamous can fly, although in general, they are not strong fliers. All ratites evolved from prehistoric flying birds, and tinamous are the closest living relative of these birds.

Footnotes

References

Further reading

Chaco nothura
Birds of the Gran Chaco
Birds of Paraguay
Tinamous of South America
Chaco nothura
Chaco nothura